1770: Ek Sangram is an upcoming Indian Telugu-language historical drama film, based on the Bengali novel Anandamath, written by Bankim Chandra Chattopadhyay in 1882. The novel and film are set in the events of the Sannyasi Rebellion, which took place in the late 18th century in Bengal. 1770: Ek Sangram is produced by SSI Entertainment and PK Entertainment.

Premise 
The film marks the 150th anniversary of 'Vande Mataram', which sparked the Swaraj movement in India against the British Empire.

Production

Development 
Film announced on 8 April 2022, marks death anniversary of Bankim Chandra Chatterjee by Ram Kamal Mukherjee, former Zee Studios head. 1770: Ek Sangram is made in Hindi, Tamil, Telugu simultaneously and dubbed versions in Kannada, Malayalam and Bengali languages.

Filming 
According to the makers, the film will be expensive and will be shot in Mumbai, Hyderabad, West Bengal and London and the Principal photography was started at the end of 2022.

References

Upcoming films
History of India on film
Films based on Bengali novels
Indian historical drama films